Kingdom of Wolaita, also known as Wolaita Kingdom, was a kingdom dominated by Wolayta people in today's southern Ethiopia from 1251 until conquest of Ethiopian Empire in 1894.

History

Wolaita tradition refounds the kingdom being well organized and ruled by strong kings since the 13th century. In this tradition, the kingdom ruled vast territories from modern Wolaita up to the central and northern areas of the country. Kindo Didaye, one of the twelve woredas of Wolaita Zone, is the area of origin of the people and the Wolaita kingdom. Its territories diminished to the present area because of different factors among which the Oromo expansion and challenges from rival people and states were the main ones.

Currency

In the early days of the trade, cotton thread known as shalwa was used as a currency before it was replaced by iron currency known as marchuwa. Shalwa and marchuwa as a currency were used not only in Wolaita, but also among the societies that settled along this trade rout as well.

Conflicts
Kawo Tona Gaga, the last king of the Wolaita kingdom, was believed to be one of its greatest warriors and most powerful kings. Emperor Menelik II of Ethiopia initially ordered Ras Mengesha Atikem of Gojjam to campaign south in order to feed his men, which put the Wolaita Kingdom in his crosshairs. However, they had experience building fortifications due to conflict with the Oromo people and repulsed the invasion. The new king Tona Gaga then set about raising an army personally loyal to him from "deposed castes and royal slaves." Menelik later marched south, calling on the king to pay tribute and spare his kingdom after reaching the border of Wolaita. Tona prepared his fortifications and refused negotiation. He also relied mistakenly upon understandings with the Oromo. Expertly dug defensive trenches and mounds crippled the initial assault, but encircling sweeps by Menelik's forces drove Tona Gaga onto the slopes of Mount Damota and he was soon caught between the Ethiopians and Oromo auxiliaries led by Ras Wolde Gyorgis, having been captured by a soldier of Negus Mikael. Abba Jifar II had sent the auxiliaries, betraying Tona Gaga.

Rulers

Wolaita had different dynasties, as well as different rulers. They ruled the kingdom using the title "Kawo."

See also
 Gifaata

References

Former monarchies of Africa
Wolayita
History of Ethiopia
States and territories established in the 1390s
14th-century establishments in Africa
1894 disestablishments in Africa